This article lists every locomotive allocated a TOPS classification and all modern traction (e.g. diesel, electric, gas turbine, petrol) stock used on the mainline network since 1948 (i.e. British Railways and post-privatisation).

Diesel locomotives
The 1955 diesel locomotive classes are given in brackets where applicable.

A large number of different shunter types were purchased by British Rail and its predecessors, many of which were withdrawn prior to the introduction of TOPS.  The tables below attempt to list the different types and the different classifications used to describe them as clearly as possible:

Small shunters: under 300 hp
Shunter classes are listed by 1955 class, which puts TOPS classes in ascending order, and generally puts 1948 and 1962 classes in ascending order. Unclassed shunters are placed at the start of the table; TOPS class 07 has been placed so its 1962 class is in the logical place.

Relation between TOPS, 1948, 1955 and 1962 classes, and 1948, 1957 and TOPS numbers:

Large shunters: 300–799 hp

 Relation between TOPS, 1948, 1955 and 1962 classes, and 1948, 1957 and TOPS numbers:

Type 1 locomotives: 800 – 1,000 hp

 Relation between TOPS, 1948, 1955 and 1962 classes, and 1948, 1957 and TOPS numbers (unless otherwise given):

Type 2 locomotives: 1,001 – 1,499 hp
Locomotive class are listed by TOPS class. Locomotives for TOPS classes 24 and 26 have their original sub-classes shown, as each wholly comprised locomotives from a distinct 1962 class. Class 21 (II) has sub-classes shown as these are superficially similar but mechanically different types grouped into a single class.

Relation between TOPS, 1948, 1955 and 1962 classes, and 1948, 1957 and TOPS numbers (unless otherwise given):

Type 3 locomotives: 1,500–1,999 hp

 Relation between TOPS, 1955 and 1962 classes, and pre-TOPS and TOPS numbers (unless otherwise given):

Type 4 locomotives: 2,000–2,999 hp

Type 5 locomotives: over 3,000 hp

Electric locomotives

Miscellaneous locomotives

Class 99

When British Rail implemented the TOPS system for managing their operating stock, ships capable of carrying rail vehicles were incorporated into the system as Class 99. In order to circumvent restrictions of the application software, these ships were entered on TOPS as locomotives, 'hauling' the trains which they carried on board. Class 99 has now been allocated to a class of bi-mode locomotives.

Builders' demonstrators
These were locomotives built and owned by private firms, but used by British Railways to test them.

Unbuilt locomotives 

A number of TOPS class numbers were allocated to proposed locomotives, both diesel and electric, which for many reasons were not proceeded with.

See also 
List of British Rail classes
 British Rail locomotive and multiple unit numbering and classification
 Steam locomotives of British Railways
List of British Rail diesel multiple unit classes
List of British Rail electric multiple unit classes
List of British Rail departmental multiple unit classes
British Rail coach type codes

Footnotes

References

External links 
  — 
 departmentals.com

 List
Modern Traction Locomotive Classes